Rhoda Walsh (born 1933) is an American bridge player from Los Angeles, California. She is a graduate from Loyola Law School and is an attorney.

Walsh is a World Bridge Federation (WBF) Master and a North American (ACBL) Grand Life Master. In  competition, she earned a bronze medal with the 1968 USA women in the quadrennial World Team Olympiad. That year she also won three major women's North American Bridge Championships—the Wagar Women's Knockout Teams and both  tournaments, the Whitehead and Smith playing with two different partners.

Walsh is a two-time winner of the annual Whitehead Women's Pairs, inaugurated 1930, playing with Hermine Baron in 1968 and with Kerri Davis in 1972. She is a three-time winner of the annual Smith Life Master Women's Pairs (est. 1961), playing with Dorothy Talmage in 1968, Amalya Kearse in 1972, and Sabine Zenkel in 1989. Five major championships for women pairs, with five partners. She won the major pairs championship for seniors, Leventritt Silver Ribbon Pairs, in 2000 playing with Charles Coon.

Bridge accomplishments

Wins

 North American Bridge Championships (12)
 Leventritt Silver Ribbon Pairs (1) 2000 
 Whitehead Women's Pairs (2) 1968, 1972 
 Smith Life Master Women's Pairs (3) 1968, 1972, 1989 
 Machlin Women's Swiss Teams (2) 1985, 1988 
 Wagar Women's Knockout Teams (1) 1968 
 Keohane North American Swiss Teams (2) 1984, 1985 
 Chicago Mixed Board-a-Match (1) 1976

Runners-up

 North American Bridge Championships
 Rockwell Mixed Pairs (1) 2000 
 Smith Life Master Women's Pairs (2) 1982, 1998 
 Machlin Women's Swiss Teams (1) 1987 
 Keohane North American Swiss Teams (1) 1986 
 Chicago Mixed Board-a-Match (1) 2005

References

External links
 Profile at Bridge Winners (maintained by Walsh)
 

American contract bridge players
American lawyers
Loyola Law School alumni
People from Los Angeles
Living people
Year of birth uncertain
Date of birth missing (living people)
Place of birth missing (living people)
1933 births